Advanced Placement (AP) Macroeconomics (also known as AP Macro and AP Macroecon) is an Advanced Placement macroeconomics course for high school students that culminates in an exam offered by the College Board.

Study begins with fundamental economic concepts such as scarcity, opportunity costs, production possibilities, specialization, comparative advantage, demand, supply, and price determination.

Major topics include measurement of economic performance, national income and price determination, fiscal and monetary policy, and international economics and growth. AP Macroeconomics is frequently taught in conjunction with (and, in some cases, in the same year as) AP Microeconomics as part of a comprehensive AP Economics curriculum, although more students take the former.

Topic outline

Basic Economic Concepts (8–12%) 
Scarcity, choice, and opportunity costs
Production possibilities curve
Comparative advantage, absolute advantage, specialization, and exchange
Demand, supply, and market equilibrium
 Macroeconomic issues: business cycle, unemployment, inflation, growth

Measurement of Economic Performance (12–16%) 
National income accounts
Circular flow
Gross domestic product
Components of gross domestic product
Real versus nominal gross domestic product
Inflation measurement and adjustment
Price indices
Nominal and real values
Costs of inflation
Unemployment
Definition and measurement
Types of unemployment
Natural rate of unemployment

National Income and Price Determination (10–15%) 
Aggregate demand
Determinants of aggregate demand
Multiplier and crowding-out effects
Aggregate supply
Short-run and long-run analyses
Sticky versus flexible wages and prices
Determinants of aggregate supply
Macroeconomic Equilibrium
Real output and price level
Short and long run
Actual versus full-employment output
Economic fluctuations

Financial Sector (15–20%) 
Financial sector:

Money, banking, and financial markets 
 Definition of financial assets: money, stocks, bonds
 Time value of money (present and future value)
 Measures of money supply
 Banks and creation of money
 Money demand
 Money market
 Loanable funds market
Central bank and control of the money supply
Tools of central bank policy
 Quantity theory of money
 Real versus nominal interest rates

Inflation, Unemployment, and Stabilization Policies (20–30%) 

 Fiscal and monetary policies 
Demand-side effects
 Supply-side effects
 Policy mix
 Government deficits and debt
 Inflation and unemployment 
 Types of inflation
 Demand-pull inflation
 Cost-push inflation
 The Phillips curve: short run versus long run
 Role of expectations

Economic Growth and Productivity (5–10%) 

 Economic Growth and Productivity:
Investment in human capital
 Investment in physical capital
Research and development, and technological progress
 Growth policy

Open Economy: International Trade and Finance (10–15%) 
Balance of payments accounts
Balance of trade
 Current account
 Capital account
Foreign exchange market 
 Demand for and supply of foreign exchange
 Exchange rate determination
 Currency appreciation and depreciation
Net exports and capital flows
 Links to financial and goods markets

Exam

Multiple Choice (2/3 of Score)

60 Questions in 70 Minutes
Reflects Topic Outline Above
Example: 3-6 Questions on Economic Growth.

Free Response (1/3 of Score) 

 3 Questions in 60 Minutes (with 10 minutes of recommended reading and planning time)

Score distribution

The exam was first held in 1989, along with Microeconomics.  Grade distributions since 2011 are as follows:

Criticism
Tawni Ferrarini, James Gwartney, and John Morton have written that the examination does not adequately cover recent advances in the field: "The AP macroeconomics exam and resources largely reflect the simplistic Keynesian view from the 1960s and 1970s." The College Board updates the AP Macroeconomics curriculum with the guidance of college and high school economics instructors. The most recent update was published in 2019.

See also 
Economics
Economics education#Curriculum
Glossary of economics

References

AP:Macroeconomics

Study Resources
 
 Reffonomics.com

Economics education
Advanced Placement